Centre for Voting Opinion & Trends in Election Research, or CVoter, is an Indian international polling agency headquartered in Delhi, India.

History
Yashwant Deshmukh is the director and founding editor of CVoter.

Clients
CVoter India states that it has covered 15 union budgets, more than 100 state elections and more than 30 international events. Since 2000 it has worked with Times Now, ANN7, United Press International, Reuters, Bloomberg News, BBC News, Aaj Tak, ABP News, Zee News, Zee Business, the Development and Educational Communication Unit of the Indian Space Research Organisation, India TV, Lok Sabha TV, UTVi business news channel (owned by UTV Software Communications), Sahara Samay (owned by Sahara India Pariwar), Jain TV, Asianet, ETV, CNEB and other news and information providers. Studies have included market research, conflict resolution research, and opinion polls.

2022 State Elections

Goa  
Opinion polls

Exit polls

Manipur  
Opinion polls

Exit polls

Punjab 
Opinion Polls

Exit polls

Uttar Pradesh  
Opinion polls

Exit polls

Uttarakhand  
Opinion polls

Exit polls

2021 State Elections (West Bengal, Tamil Nadu, Kerala, Assam & Puducherry)

Assam

Kerala

Tamil Nadu

West Bengal

2021 Desh Ka Mood by Team Cvoter & ABP News
ABP News-CVoter gauges the nation's sentiments with ‘Desh ka Mood’ Survey

58% of people favor NDA government, 28% favor UPA: ABP News’ Desh Ka Mood survey 

Naveen country's best CM

2020 Trust on Media Institutions
CVoter carried out a survey Trust on Indian media institutions 

Indian readers place higher credibility to newspapers, survey finds

2020 Bihar elections 
Bihar Assembly polls: It had projected 104-128 seats for the NDA and 108-131 seats for the opposition grand alliance. NDA secured a total of 125 seats (37.26% votes) while MGB won 110 seats (37.23% votes).

2021 State Elections (West Bengal, Tamil Nadu, Kerala, Assam)
May 2016 saw elections in Bengal, Assam, Tamil Nadu and Kerala. CVoter was the only one of five polling agencies to predict the Tamil Nadu outcome correctly.

2016 United States elections
The UPI/CVoter poll wrongly predicted a Hillary Clinton victory in the 2016 United States presidential election. When the results were declared Donald Trump won the election.

2009 Indian general elections
The CVoter exit poll projections for India TV showed the UPA with 189–201 seats. It gives the Congress 149–155, the DMK between 9 and 13, the NCP 12–16 and the Trinamool between 12 and 16. The poll showed the BJP-led Front getting between 183 and 195 seats. It includes the BJP (140–146), the JD (U) 17–21. In the end, in 2009 Indian general election, UPA got 262 (Congress – 206) and NDA 159 (BJP – 116).

2004 Indian general elections
The CVoter exit poll projections for Star News predicted NDA getting between 267–279 and Congress+Allies between 169 and 181. In the end, in 2004 Indian general election, Congress+Allies (UPA) got 218 (Congress 145) and NDA got 181 (BJP – 138).

Controversy
CVoter allegedly carried out tracking polls for Indian news networks Times Now, India Today & India TV. A television news channel claimed in a sting operation conducted by it that some of the agencies which conduct opinion polls before elections are willing to tweak their findings for money. It included global giants like Ipsos and CVoter. After the expose, India Today Group suspended its CVoter contract.

Notes

References

Companies based in Delhi
Opinion polling in India
Public opinion research companies in India